The 2015 China Open was a tennis tournament played on outdoor hard courts. It was the 17th edition of the China Open for the men (19th for the women). It was part of ATP World Tour 500 series on the 2015 ATP World Tour, and the last WTA Premier Mandatory tournament of the 2015 WTA Tour. Both the men's and the women's events were held at the National Tennis Center in Beijing, China, from October 5 to October 11, 2015.

Points and prize money

Point distribution

Prize money

ATP singles main-draw entrants

Seeds 

 1 Rankings are as of September 28, 2015

Other entrants 
The following players received wildcards into the singles main draw:
  Lu Yen-hsun 
  Wu Di
  Zhang Ze

The following players received entry from the qualifying draw:  
  Aljaž Bedene
  Simone Bolelli
  Denis Istomin
  John Millman

Withdrawals 
Before the tournament
  Philipp Kohlschreiber → replaced by  Andreas Haider-Maurer
  Florian Mayer → replaced by  Vasek Pospisil
  Leonardo Mayer → replaced by  Víctor Estrella Burgos

ATP doubles main-draw entrants

Seeds

 Rankings are as of September 28, 2015

Other entrants
The following pairs received wildcards into the doubles main draw:
  Djordje Djokovic /  Novak Djokovic
  Gong Maoxin /  Michael Venus

The following pair received entry from the qualifying draw:
  Julian Knowle /  Oliver Marach

WTA singles main-draw entrants

Seeds 

1 Rankings as of September 28, 2015.

Other entrants 
The following players received wildcards into the singles main draw:
  Casey Dellacqua 
  Han Xinyun 
  Wang Qiang 
  Zhang Shuai
  Zheng Saisai

The following player received entry using a protected ranking into the singles main draw:
  Dominika Cibulková
 
The following players received entry from the qualifying draw:
  Lara Arruabarrena
  Kateryna Bondarenko
  Mariana Duque Mariño
  Irina Falconi
  Bojana Jovanovski
  Bethanie Mattek-Sands
  Monica Puig 
  Yulia Putintseva

Withdrawals 
Before the tournament
  Victoria Azarenka (thigh injury)→replaced by  Alison Van Uytvanck
  Karin Knapp →replaced by  Mirjana Lučić-Baroni
  Sabine Lisicki (knee and leg injury)→replaced by  Carina Witthöft
  Ekaterina Makarova (leg injury) →replaced by  Mona Barthel
  Peng Shuai (back injury)→replaced by  Roberta Vinci
  Lucie Šafářová (abdominal injury and bacterial infection) →replaced by  Alexandra Dulgheru
  Maria Sharapova (left forearm injury) →replaced by  Julia Görges
  Serena Williams (fatigue and injuries) →replaced by  Teliana Pereira

During the tournament 
 Belinda Bencic (right hand injury)

Retirements 
  Madison Keys (thigh injury)
  Eugenie Bouchard (dizziness due to ongoing concussion) 
  Zarina Diyas (left lower calf injury)
  Simona Halep (left ankle injury)
  Lesia Tsurenko (right elbow injury)
  CoCo Vandeweghe (left ankle injury)

WTA doubles main-draw entrants

Seeds

1 Rankings are as of September 28, 2015

Other entrants
The following pairs received wildcards into the doubles main draw:
  Alizé Cornet /  Magda Linette 
  Han Xinyun /  Yang Zhaoxuan 
  Svetlana Kuznetsova /  Samantha Stosur
  Liang Chen /  Wang Yafan

The following pair received entry as alternates:
  Kateryna Bondarenko /  Olga Savchuk

Withdrawals
Before the tournament
  Garbiñe Muguruza (left ankle injury and gastrointestinal injury)
During the tournament 
 Alla Kudryavtseva (left hip injury)
 Mona Barthel (right wrist injury)

Champions

Men's singles

 Novak Djokovic def  Rafael Nadal 6–2, 6–2

Women's singles

 Garbiñe Muguruza def  Tímea Bacsinszky 7–5, 6–4

Men's doubles

 Vasek Pospisil /  Jack Sock def  Daniel Nestor /  Édouard Roger-Vasselin 3–6, 6–3, [10–6]

Women's doubles

  Martina Hingis /  Sania Mirza def  Chan Hao-ching /  Chan Yung-jan, 6–7(9–11), 6–1, [10–8]

References

External links
Official Website